Stockinbingal is a town in the South West Slopes and Riverina regions of New South Wales, Australia. The town is in the Cootamundra–Gundagai Regional Council local government area and on the Burley Griffin Way.

Stockinbingal Post Office opened on 16 May 1891.

Railways 
It is the location of a railway junction connecting the Cootamundra to Lake Cargelligo railway line (completed to Stockinbingal in 1893) to Parkes, which provides an alternative route from Sydney to Parkes to the route over the Blue Mountains, avoiding that route's steep grades and is now as a result the major route for freight between Sydney and Perth.  The route from Cootamundra to Stockinbingal and Parkes is also part of a rail bypass of Sydney for traffic between Melbourne and Brisbane via Dubbo, Werris Creek and Maitland.

Yeo Yeo 
Stockinbingal is the closest town to the Yeo Yeo district, where the Bradman family had a farm and Don Bradman lived as a child. The shell of the old Yeo Yeo schoolhouse may be seen a few km from town on the road to Wallendbeen.

See also 
 Stockinbingal–Parkes railway line
 Stockinbingal railway station

Gallery

References

External links

Towns in New South Wales
Cootamundra-Gundagai Regional Council